Ragıp Hulûsi Özdem (1893 – 1943) was a Turkish linguist and politician, who was an early member of the Kemalist modernization movement. He was a member of the commission involved in introducing the modern Turkish alphabet.

References 

1893 births
1943 deaths
Politicians from Thessaloniki
Republican People's Party (Turkey) politicians
Category:Istanbul University Faculty of Law alumni